Arxama atralis is a moth in the family Crambidae. It was described by George Hampson in 1897. It is found in Malaysia.

The wingspan is about 16 mm. The forewings are black brown with a white speck at the base and a white subbasal line, as well as a nearly straight white antemedial line. The hindwings have a white antemedial line, as well as two white postmedial specks below the costa and a marginal orange band with a white lunule on the inner side below the costa.

References

Moths described in 1897
Spilomelinae
Moths of Asia